SIMULATE (formerly known as NUGGS) is a food technology company headquartered in SoHo, Manhattan which manufactures plant-based alternatives to meat products. The company was founded in 2018 by Ben Pasternak and Sam Terris.

The company's main product is NUGGS, a plant-based chicken nugget alternative. SIMULATE also makes a plant-based chicken patty product called DISCS.

History 
The product NUGGS was launched in July of 2019 via a direct-to-consumer website. NUGGS began sale in retail stores such as Whole Foods Market, Walmart, Sam's Club, and Target in early 2021. The company also sells its products through ghost kitchens in San Francisco and Los Angeles. In July of 2019, SIMULATE (then NUGGS) announced that it was changing its name to SIMULATE. The company plans to expand internationally, first to Canada.

References 

Vegetarian companies and establishments